Kamerlingh Onnes is a compound surname of Dutch origin. People with the name include:

 Harm Kamerlingh Onnes (1893–1985), Dutch portrait painter and ceramist
 Heike Kamerlingh Onnes (1853–1926), Dutch physicist and Nobel laureate
 Kamerlingh Onnes (crater), a lunar impact crater
 Kamerlingh Onnes Award for work in low-temperature science and technology
 Kamerlingh Onnes Prize for work in superconductivity

See also
 Onnes (disambiguation)

Compound surnames
Dutch-language surnames